Slobodan Dunđerski (born March 1, 1988) is a Serbian professional basketball player.

External links
 Slobodan Dunđerski at fiba.com
 Slobodan Dunđerski at eurobasket.com

1988 births
Living people
ABA League players
Basketball League of Serbia players
Basketball players from Belgrade
BKK Radnički players
KK FMP players
KK Metalac Valjevo players
KK Vizura players
KK Mladost Zemun players
KK Vojvodina Srbijagas players
OKK Beograd players
Point guards
Serbian expatriate basketball people in Hungary
Serbian expatriate basketball people in Lithuania
Serbian expatriate basketball people in North Macedonia
Serbian expatriate basketball people in Romania
Serbian men's basketball players